Vihorlat Protected Landscape Area is one of 14 protected landscape areas in Slovakia. The Landscape Area is in the middle part of the Vihorlatské vrchy mountains, in eastern Slovakia. It is in the Humenné, Sobrance and Snina districts.

History
The park was created on 28 December 1973 and the law creating it was amended on 19 April 1999.

Geography, geology and biology
The area of the Vihorlat Mountains is of volcanic origin. Beech, oak, ash, maple, and fir trees are most common in Vihorlat. The area contains about 2,000 species of invertebrates and 100 species of birds. Notable species include Eurasian lynx, wildcat, gray wolf, otter, black stork, Ural owl, lesser spotted eagle, and Eurasian eagle-owl. A curiosity in the park is the Morské oko (literally 'Sea Eye') Lake.

Gallery

See also 
 Vihorlat Mountains
 Morské oko

References

External links
 Chránená krajinná oblasť Vihorlat (in Slovak)
 Photo gallery Vihorlat, Photo gallery Sninský kameň, Photo gallery Inversion – Vihorlat, Sninský kameň (photos of Vihorlat and Sninský kameň)
 Vihorlat PLA at Slovakia.travel
 Vihorlat PLA at The Slovak State Nature Conservancy

Protected areas of Slovakia
Protected areas established in 1973
Geography of Prešov Region
Tourist attractions in Prešov Region
Geography of Košice Region
Tourist attractions in Košice Region